Dainius Gintas Zubrus (born June 16, 1978) is a Lithuanian former professional ice hockey right winger and centre who played in the National Hockey League (NHL), the first Lithuanian to have played 1,000 games in the NHL. Drafted 15th overall in the 1996 NHL Entry Draft by the Philadelphia Flyers, Zubrus played for the Flyers, Montreal Canadiens, Washington Capitals, Buffalo Sabres, New Jersey Devils and San Jose Sharks.

Playing career

Early career
In the summer of 1989 at 11 years of age, Zubrus moved to Kharkiv, Ukrainian SSR, Soviet Union, to train under Ukrainian coach Ivan Pravilov, with whom he became close as he played for him for six years, on the Druzhba-78 squad, where he played until the end of 1995. As a youth, he played in the 1992 Quebec International Pee-Wee Hockey Tournament with them. Pravilov was arrested in 2012 for sexual abuse of a teenage student, and committed suicide by hanging in prison. Zubrus said: "Since learning of the terrible accusations against my former coach, all my thoughts and concerns have been for the children. I have reached out to the children, and assured them that I am, and will continue to be, there for them."

Professional

The Philadelphia Flyers selected Zubrus 15th overall in the 1996 NHL Entry Draft from the Caledon Canadians of the Metro Junior A Hockey League, making him the highest drafted Tier II Junior "A" player since the inception of the Canadian Junior A Hockey League in 1993 (a record later surpassed when Kyle Turris was selected third at 2007 NHL Entry Draft). Prior to being traded to Caledon, Zubrus played for the Pembroke Lumber Kings of the Central Junior A Hockey League.

Zubrus made his NHL debut on October 5, 1996, scoring a goal against the Florida Panthers. In his rookie season, he helped the Flyers reach the 1997 Stanley Cup Finals. The Flyers traded him to the Montreal Canadiens on March 10, 1999, along with a pair of draft picks, in exchange for Mark Recchi. He registered his first career hat-trick on October 14, 2000, against the Chicago Blackhawks, and was traded to the Washington Capitals (along with Trevor Linden) in exchange for Richard Zedník and Jan Bulis on March 13, 2001.
 
During the 2004–05 NHL lockout, Zubrus decided to play abroad with Capitals teammate Alexander Semin. He played 42 regular season games for Lada Togliatti, recording 8 goals and 11 assists for 19 points. He also appeared in ten playoff games while in the former Russian Superleague (RSL), scoring three goals and one assist.

Zubrus returned to the Capitals the following 2005–06 season and recorded a career-high 57 points playing alongside star rookie Alexander Ovechkin. In the 2006–07 season, Zubrus continued his impressive form, posting 52 points in 60 games before he was traded on February 27, 2007, to the Buffalo Sabres (along with Timo Helbling) in exchange for Jiří Novotný and a first round-draft pick.

On July 3, 2007, as a free agent, Zubrus signed a six-year, $20.4 million contract with the New Jersey Devils.

On November 23, 2008, Zubrus had one of the best offensive games in Devils history. Zubrus tied a team record with four goals to help New Jersey win its season-high fourth straight game, 7–3 over the Tampa Bay Lightning. Four years later, Zubrus got to his second Stanley Cup decision, losing the 2012 Stanley Cup Finals to the Los Angeles Kings. On July 4, 2013, the Devils re-signed Zubrus to a reported three-year contract.

On July 29, 2015, after eight seasons with the Devils, Zubrus was placed on unconditional waivers for the purpose of terminating the final year of his contract.

On October 27, 2015, it was announced Zubrus was invited to professional tryout (PTO) with the St. Louis Blues. On November 6, 2015, Zubrus was released from his professional tryout after the Blues opted instead to sign Martin Havlát to a one-year contract.

On November 16, 2015, Zubrus was invited to a professional tryout by the San Jose Sharks. Eight days later, he signed a contract with the Sharks, reuniting with former Devils head coach Peter DeBoer and former Devils teammate Paul Martin. With San Jose, Zubrus reached his third Stanley Cup Finals, which the Sharks lost to the Pittsburgh Penguins. He retired during the off-season.

International play
Originally, Zubrus had suited up for the Russia national team during the World Cup of Hockey in 2004. But since then, he has played internationally for Lithuania, most notably in the 2005 World Championships. He had told the press, "Lithuania needs me more than Russia". Because of the existence of the Soviet Union, players born during its time as a nation were able to choose to play for any of the newly formed countries after the breakup, and even considered representing Ukraine due to his training there.

Personal life
Zubrus is married to Canadian model Nathalie Sanschagrin. They have a son, Tomas, and a daughter, Emma.

Zubrus holds dual citizenship and is the citizen of Lithuania and the United States.

Career statistics

Regular season and playoffs

International

See also
 List of NHL players with 1,000 games played

References

External links

 
 Q & A with Dainius Zubrus at The Hockey Writers

1978 births
Living people
Buffalo Sabres players
Expatriate ice hockey players in Canada
Expatriate ice hockey players in Russia
Expatriate ice hockey players in the United States
HC Lada Togliatti players
Lithuanian emigrants to the United States
Lithuanian expatriate ice hockey people
Lithuanian expatriate sportspeople in Canada
Lithuanian expatriate sportspeople in Russia
Lithuanian expatriate sportspeople in the United States
Lithuanian ice hockey centres
Montreal Canadiens players
National Hockey League first-round draft picks
New Jersey Devils players
People from Elektrėnai
Philadelphia Flyers draft picks
Philadelphia Flyers players
San Jose Sharks players
Washington Capitals players